Alexander Homér (born 4 October 1970) is a former football player from Slovakia and currently manager of TJ Iskra Borčice.

External links
 Futbalnet profile
 Fotbal.idnes profile

References

1970 births
Living people
Slovak footballers
FK Dubnica players
1. FC Slovácko players
AS Trenčín players
Slovak Super Liga players
Czech First League players
Expatriate footballers in the Czech Republic
Slovak football managers
FK Iskra Borčice managers
Association football defenders